This is a list of moths of the United States.

List

References

 Moths
United States